Dimorphic Cynosure is the fifth studio album by the Austrian death metal band Thirdmoon, released through Maintain Records in 2007.

Track listing
"Slave"
"Crawl through subspecies"
"Sinew disconnected"
"Character of scars"
"Cross the Rubicon"
"Dimorphic Cynosure"
"Sentenced to aeons"
"Instrumental"
"Souls to drown"
"Cadaverous haven"
"Livid"
"Entwined dimensions"
"Nothing"

2007 albums
Thirdmoon albums